Steven Charles Stricker (born February 23, 1967) is an American professional golfer who plays on the PGA Tour and the PGA Tour Champions. He has twelve victories on the PGA  Tour, including the WGC-Match Play title in 2001 and two FedEx Cup playoff events. His most successful season on tour came at age 42 in 2009, with three victories and a runner-up finish on the money list. Stricker spent over 250 weeks in the top-10 of the Official World Golf Ranking, reaching a career-high world ranking of No. 2 in September 2009. Stricker served as U.S. Ryder Cup captain for the 2021 matches, winning at Whistling Straits in his home state of Wisconsin.

Early life
Born in Edgerton, Wisconsin, Stricker grew up playing golf at Lake Ripley Country Club in nearby Cambridge and Edgerton Towne Country Club in Edgerton. A 1990 graduate of the University of Illinois, Stricker earned All-American honors as a member of the Illini golf team in 1988 and 1989.

Professional career
Stricker turned professional in 1990 and began his career on the Canadian Professional Golf Tour, where he won two tournaments. He joined the PGA Tour in 1994, and his first success at the top level came in 1996 when Stricker notched two victories (Kemper Open, Motorola Western Open) and seven top-ten finishes to finish fourth on the 1996 PGA Tour money list.

In 1998, Stricker played himself into contention in the final round of the PGA Championship at Sahalee Country Club near Seattle. PGA Tour veteran Vijay Singh bested Stricker down the stretch thanks to a back-nine surge and claimed a two-stroke victory. This runner-up finish remains Stricker's best result in a major championship to date. Stricker has finished inside the top-20 six times at the U.S. Open, with his best finish a fifth-place in 1999 at Pinehurst No. 2. He won his third and most prestigious PGA Tour title at the WGC Match Play Championship in 2001, where he defeated Pierre Fulke 2 and 1 in Australia to earn the $1,000,000 prize. This remains as the only time that the WGC Match Play Championship was played outside of the United States.

Stricker lost his tour card in 2004. At age 39 in 2006, relying on sponsor exemptions, he managed seven top-ten finishes and was voted the tour's Comeback Player of the Year. In 2007 he won his fourth PGA Tour title at The Barclays on August 26, ending an 11-year victory drought on American soil, although he had previously triumphed down in Australia in 2001. This run of success earned him a spot on the Presidents Cup team in 2007.

After his victory at The Barclays, which was the first of the four FedEx Cup playoff events, Stricker reached No. 4 in the Official World Golf Ranking, his highest career ranking at that point. Stricker finished runner-up in the 2007 FedEx Cup Playoffs behind Tiger Woods, and was again selected as Comeback Player of the Year. He was also inducted into the Wisconsin State Golf Association Hall of Fame in 2007.

At the Mercedes Benz Championship, the opening event of the 2008 season, Stricker lost out in a play-off to Daniel Chopra. This result took Stricker to No. 3 in the Official World Golf Ranking, again at the time his highest ranking to date.

At the Bob Hope Classic in January 2009, Stricker shot third and fourth round scores of 61 and 62 at the PGA West Palmer and Nicklaus courses to set the 36-hole scoring record on the PGA Tour at 123, beating a record that Pat Perez had held for only two days. (This record fell in October when Troy Matteson shot 61-61=122 at the Frys.com Open.) His four-round total of 33-under-par in the five-round event also set the PGA Tour record for lowest score relative to par for 72 holes, exceeding Ernie Els' total of 31 under par in the 2003 Mercedes-Benz Championship at Kapalua. The third-round 61 was Stricker's best score on tour to that point, but a  77 in the final round dropped him into a tie for third.

Stricker won his fifth PGA Tour title at Colonial in Texas at the end of May 2009, with a playoff win over Tim Clark and Steve Marino. The win was aided by a  chip-in on the 71st hole. He won again in July at the John Deere Classic in Silvis, Illinois. After the second round was rained-out on Friday, the field was forced to play 36 holes on Sunday. Stricker shot an afternoon round of 64, which included a hole-out wedge shot for eagle on the 6th hole, and by three strokes over runners-up Zach Johnson, Brandt Snedeker, and Brett Quigley. He also matched his career low round on tour with a second round of 61 (−10).

Stricker's third win of 2009, and seventh overall, came in September at the Deutsche Bank Championship, the second of four playoff events. He began the final round tied with Retief Goosen and Sean O'Hair, and birdied the final hole to win by one stroke over Jason Dufner and Scott Verplank. It was Stricker's second FedEx Cup playoff win, a win that also vaulted him ahead of Tiger Woods to the top of the FedEx Cup standings and vaulted him to No. 2 in the Official World Golf Ranking, his highest ranking achieved during his career. Stricker has been called "Mr. September" due to his success in the FedEx Cup playoffs, where he has never finished outside the top-25 in his first ten career starts.

In February 2010, Stricker won his eighth tour title at the Northern Trust Open with a 16-under-par 268 winning total. With this win at Riviera, he passed Phil Mickelson and regained his ranking as World No. 2.

In July, Stricker shot a career-low 60 (−11) in the first round of the John Deere Classic. However, a 59 shot by Paul Goydos incredibly put him one stroke back of the lead. He followed with rounds of 66 and 62, for a total of 188, to set a tour 54-hole scoring record. He then shot 70 on Sunday to win his ninth PGA Tour, two strokes ahead of Goydos.

In June 2011, Stricker won at the Memorial Tournament in Ohio, his tenth tour title. He opened with 68 and bettered this with 67 in the second round. However, this was made special by the hole-in-one he recorded at the par three 8th hole to hold a three stroke advantage at the halfway stage. Remarkably, he then opened round three with two eagles in the first five holes to open up a six-shot lead midway through round three, but some uncharacteristic mistakes on the back nine saw him fall back towards the rest of the field. He held on to the 36-hole lead to eventually win by one stroke over runners-up Matt Kuchar and Brandt Jobe. With this victory, Stricker became the highest-ranked American in the Official World Golf Ranking, at fourth in the world. For the first time in his career, 44-year-old Stricker was ranked higher than all other American golfers, including Tiger Woods and Phil Mickelson. Stricker played the tournament at −20 for the front nine, a record by 6 shots, versus +4 for the back nine.

In July, Stricker gained his eleventh tour win at the John Deere Classic, sinking a  birdie putt at the 72nd hole, one stroke ahead of runner-up Kyle Stanley. Stricker bogeyed the 15th and 16th to fall two strokes behind Stanley in a commanding position throughout most of Sunday's round. He then bounced back with a birdie on the par five 17th while Stanley made bogeyed the 18th. Stricker, tied for the lead at this point, drove into a fairway bunker off the tee and then played his second shot just over the back of the green, but holed the putt from the fringe for the victory. This was Stricker's third straight victory at the John Deere Classic becoming just the 10th golfer since World War II to win a tournament three straight times.

Stricker tied a major championship record with a 63 in the first round at the PGA Championship in 2011 and led by two shots. His next three days were 74-69-73, and he tied for twelfth. Stricker's career earnings are over $44 million through the end of the 2018–19 season, among the highest of those without a major title.

Stricker started the 2012 season with a win in the season-opening Tournament of Champions at Kapalua on Maui. He shot a ten-under 63 on day two and held the lead until the end, three strokes ahead of runner-up Martin Laird. It was his twelfth PGA Tour title. He missed the cut in May at The Players Championship, his first since the 2009 PGA Championship. It ended a streak of 49 consecutive cuts, which was the longest on tour.

At the start of the 2013 season, Stricker announced he would cut his schedule "in half," hoping to play just "10 or 12" tournaments. As the defending champion, he finished runner-up at the Hyundai Tournament of Champions despite suffering from a herniated disc. He then reached the quarterfinals at the WGC-Accenture Match Play Championship, his best performance since his victory in 2001.

In 2017, Stricker joined the PGA Tour Champions. In his first event, the Tucson Conquistadores Classic, he finished one stroke behind Tom Lehman. Stricker asked the USGA for a special exemption to play in the 2017 U.S. Open held in his home state, but his request was denied. He eventually earned entry through a qualifying tournament in Memphis. Stricker was the captain of the victorious U.S. team in the 2017 Presidents Cup.

In March 2018, Stricker won his first event on the PGA Tour Champions, the Cologuard Classic, by two strokes. He then won his second straight start at the Rapiscan Systems Classic in Saucier, Mississippi. In September 2018, he won the Sanford International tournament on the PGA Tour Champions.

In 2018, U.S. captain Jim Furyk named Stricker a non-playing vice-captain for the 2018 Ryder Cup team. The U.S. lost 17 1/2 to 10 1/2 to the European team.

In 2019, Stricker won his first senior major championship at the Regions Tradition, claiming a six-stroke win over the field. Then in June of the same year, Stricker won his second senior major at the U.S. Senior Open, again by six strokes over Jerry Kelly and David Toms.

In April 2021, Stricker won the Chubb Classic for his sixth win on the PGA Tour Champions.

In May 2021, Stricker came close to defending his title at the senior major, the Regions Tradition. Stricker birdied the last hole in regulation to force a playoff with Alex Čejka. Čejka won the playoff with a birdie on the first playoff hole.

In June 2021, Stricker won his third senior major at the Senior Players Championship at Firestone Country Club in Akron, Ohio. Stricker led by eight strokes going into the final round. He shot an even-par 70 in the final round and won by six strokes over Jerry Kelly.

In May 2022, Stricker won his fourth senior major title at the Regions Tradition in Birmingham, Alabama. Stricker shot a 4-under 68 in the final round for a 6-stroke victory. It was his first victory since he had to take a leave of absence for health reasons after the 2021 Ryder Cup.

In August 2022, Stricker won The Ally Challenge and in September 2022, he won the Sanford International in South Dakota in a playoff over Robert Karlsson. This brought him to 10 career PGA Tour Champions victories.

In October 2022, Stricker won the Constellation Furyk & Friends by two shots.

Personal
Stricker married into a golfing family. His father-in-law, Dennis Tiziani, and his brother-in-law, Mario Tiziani, played on the PGA Tour. He and his wife, Nicki, have two children. Nicki is often her husband's caddie.

At the opening ceremony of the 2021 Ryder Cup, while captaining the United States team, Stricker revealed that he was a supporter of the Chicago Bears despite being from Wisconsin, much to the chagrin of the present crowd, many of whom support the home-state Green Bay Packers; the two teams have one of the largest rivalries within the NFL. At the victory ceremony concluding the event, Dustin Johnson quipped to Stricker, "Next time, let's not tell all the Green Bay fans that you're a Bears fan."

Professional wins (35)

PGA Tour wins (12)

PGA Tour playoff record (1–1)

Canadian Tour wins (2)

Other wins (9)
1987 Wisconsin State Open (as an amateur)
1990 Wisconsin State Open
1991 Wisconsin State Open
1998 Wisconsin State Open
2000 Wisconsin State Open
2009 The Shark Shootout (with Jerry Kelly)
2013 CVS Caremark Charity Classic (with Bo Van Pelt)
2014 CVS Caremark Charity Classic (with Bo Van Pelt)
2017 QBE Shootout (with Sean O'Hair)

PGA Tour Champions wins (12)

PGA Tour Champions playoff record (1–2)

Results in major championships
Results not in chronological order in 2020.

CUT = missed the half-way cut
"T" = tied
NT = No tournament due to COVID-19 pandemic

Summary

Most consecutive cuts made – 27 (2010 Masters – 2018 US Open)
Longest streak of top-10s – 2 (2006 U.S. Open – 2006 PGA)

Results in The Players Championship

CUT = missed the halfway cut
"T" indicates a tie for a place
C = Canceled after the first round due to the COVID-19 pandemic

World Golf Championships

Wins (1)

Results timeline

1Cancelled due to 9/11

QF, R16, R32, R64 = Round in which player lost in match play
"T" = tied
NT = No tournament
Note that the HSBC Champions did not become a WGC event until 2009.

Senior major championships

Wins (4)

Results timeline

"T" indicates a tie for a place
NT = No tournament due to COVID-19 pandemic

PGA Tour career summary

* As of the 2021 season.

PGA Tour Champions career summary

* As of end of 2022 season
** 2020 and 2021 seasons were combined due to the COVID-19 pandemic

U.S. national team appearances
Professional
Dunhill Cup: 1996 (winners)
Presidents Cup: 1996 (winners), 2007 (winners), 2009 (winners), 2011 (winners), 2013 (winners), 2017 (non-playing captain, winners)
Ryder Cup: 2008 (winners), 2010, 2012, 2021 (non-playing captain, winners)

See also
1993 PGA Tour Qualifying School graduates
List of golfers with most PGA Tour Champions wins

References

External links

American male golfers
Illinois Fighting Illini men's golfers
PGA Tour golfers
PGA Tour Champions golfers
Ryder Cup competitors for the United States
Winners of senior major golf championships
Golfers from Wisconsin
People from Edgerton, Wisconsin
Sportspeople from Madison, Wisconsin
1967 births
Living people